Carolyn Kawasaki (カイヤ）born Carolyn Jo Higar in German Valley, Illinois, on May 25) is a model, TV personality, and businessperson. Prior to her debut on television in Japan, she traveled Europe, U.S., and Japan as a fashion model for the likes of Vogue, Harper's Bazaar, Cosmopolitan, to name a few.

Caiya was born in German Valley, Illinois, USA to Patricia Jacobs (mother) and Richard Higar (father).  She was scouted by model agent Eileen Ford, while shopping with her mother in Chicago. She went on to live with Ford at her house in New York. Soon after she went on to model for famous brands such as Chloe, Salvatore Ferragamo, Giofranco Ferre, Vogue, Harper's Bazaar, Cosmopolitan, amongst others. She was selected for the "unitika swimwear campaign" in Japan. As a result, she started working in the Japanese entertainment business and appeared in an array of TV shows, commercials, movies, and dramas. She has authored lifestyle books on topics such as cooking, English, DIY, interior design, fashion, and beauty.  She also opened a fashion boutique. She has appeared on "hustle", a Japanese wrestling show as a wrestler as well.

Other pursuits
In 1999, Caiya released a cooking book, Caiya no Ai Ippai Cooking.
In 2001, she released an English conversation book, Caiya no Eikaiwa Haato de Tooku.
In 2002, she released a beauty book, Caiya no Anti-Aging.
In 2004, she released an interior design book, Home Sweet Home Caiya.

References

External links

Official blog

1962 births
Living people
Expatriate television personalities in Japan
People from Chicago
American expatriates in Japan